This is a list of public art in the county of Cornwall, England. This list applies only to works of public art on permanent display in an outdoor public space. For example, this does not include artworks in museums.

See also
Mount Edgcumbe Country Park — Over a dozen examples of what can be considered art rather than landscaping feature in the country park, including a triumphal arch and numerous decorative public garden ornaments.
Stone crosses in Cornwall

References

External links

Cor
Culture in Cornwall
Public art
Monuments and memorials in Cornwall